Vladimir Kapitonov is a Russian-American biologist and geneticist.

Research
In 2005 he and Jerzy Jurka described a new genetic element called a Polinton which is self-synthesizing in such plants and insects as entamoeba, fruit flies, and fungi. They also discovered it in various species of chicken, fish, frogs, lizards, and such underwater species as sea squirts, sea urchins and anemones.

In October 2007 he and Jurka paired up again, this time to describe transposable element in Arabidopsis thaliana, Oryza sativa and Caenorhabditis elegans plant species which became known as Helitron which he suggests plays a major role in genomic evolution.

In 2011 he studied a microRNA gene which was previously discovered in mice and made even further discovery that by using various bioinformatic tools its intron contains SFMBT2 gene.

References

Living people
21st-century American biologists
Russian biologists
American molecular biologists
Year of birth missing (living people)